Urijah Faber (born May 14, 1979) is an American mixed martial artist and actor who is signed to the Ultimate Fighting Championship. He competed as a bantamweight and formerly competed as a featherweight. He is also the founder of Team Alpha Male.

Faber was an NCAA wrestler. With his base in wrestling, he later started Brazilian jiu-jitsu and quickly earned a brown belt under Fábio "Pateta" Prado. Faber won the WEC Featherweight Championship at WEC 19 on March 17, 2006, and held the title for over two and a half years until losing it to Mike Brown at WEC 36 on November 5, 2008. He went on to challenge for the WEC Featherweight Championship two more times and challenged for the UFC Bantamweight Championship four times.
 
Faber is widely regarded as one of MMA's pioneers for establishing legitimacy to lighter-weight classes. After his retirement on July 6, 2017, Faber was inducted into the UFC Hall of Fame as a part of the Modern-era wing. He came out of retirement in 2019 and defeated Ricky Simón by first-round TKO.

Early life
Faber was born on May 14, 1979, in Isla Vista, California, to Theo and Suzanne Faber. He is of Dutch descent on his father's side, and Italian, English, and Irish on his mother's side. He went to Glen Edwards Middle School, Casa Roble High School and Lincoln High School (Lincoln, California). He has two siblings, Ryan and Michaella. Faber graduated from the University of California, Davis with a bachelor's degree in Human Development. While at UC-Davis, Faber  qualified for the national NCAA tournament in 2001 and 2002 in wrestling.

Mixed martial arts career 
Faber made his professional MMA debut as part of the Gladiator Challenge promotion on November 12, 2003, defeating Poes Manne by a guillotine choke at 1:22 of round 1. Faber then defeated George Adkins by TKO (strikes) on February 12, 2004, earning a shot at GC Bantamweight champion, David Velasquez. On June 6, 2004, Faber defeated Velasquez by unanimous decision, becoming the new GC Bantamweight champion. In his first title defense, Faber defeated Del Hawkins by TKO (strikes) at 3:19 of the first round on August 19, 2004. After this fight, Faber began to take fights in both GC and King of the Cage, GC's parent promotion.

Upon moving to KOTC, Faber defeated Rami Boukai by majority decision on September 24, 2004, barely a month after his last fight. On November 14, 2004, Faber defeated Eben Kaneshiro by submission (strikes) to win the King of the Cage Bantamweight Championship, co-holding it with the GC Bantamweight title.

On March 13, 2005, Faber made his return to GC, defeating David Granados by rear naked choke at 2:13 of round 1. On May 7, 2005, he defended his KOTC belt for the first time, defeating Hiroyuki Abe by TKO (cut) at 2:37 of the third round. Returning to GC on September 10, 2005, Faber had his first defeat, losing the GC Bantamweight championship to Tyson Griffin by TKO (strikes) in the third round, in only five seconds.

On October 29, 2005, Faber defended his KOTC title again, defeating Shawn Bias by guillotine choke at 1:24 of the first round. He returned to GC on December 11, 2005, defeating Charles Bennett by rear-naked choke at 4:38 of round 1. Faber then fought at a TKO Major League MMA event on January 8, 2006, facing Ivan Menjivar. Faber won by disqualification at 2:02 of the second round when Menjivar landed an illegal kick to a downed Faber.

World Extreme Cagefighting

On March 17, 2006, Faber competed for the first time in the World Extreme Cagefighting promotion, beating Cole Escovedo by second-round doctors stoppage and winning the WEC Featherweight Championship.
On May 13, 2006, he fought for the King of the Cage Bantamweight Championship for the third time, defeating Charlie Valencia by rear naked choke submission at 3:09 of the first round. Faber then returned to GC July 1, 2006, and defeated Naoya Uematsu by TKO (strikes) at 3:35 of round 2 to reclaim the GC Bantamweight championship, thus holding three titles at once. Faber then took a fight in the Full Contact Promotions organization on September 9, 2006, defeating Enoch Wilson by TKO (strikes) at 1:01 of the second round. On October 28, Faber returned to KOTC and defended his title for the fourth and last time, defeating Bibiano Fernandes by TKO (cut) at 4:16 of round 1. Faber later vacated his KOTC and GC titles upon signing a contract with the WEC after it was purchased by Zuffa in December 2006.

At WEC 25: McCullough vs. Cope on January 20, 2007, Faber defended his WEC Featherweight Championship for the first time since winning it ten months prior, defeating Joe Pearson by submission (strikes) at 2:31 of the first round. At WEC 26: Condit vs. Alessio on March 24, 2007, he successfully defended his title for a second time by defeating Dominick Cruz by guillotine choke submission at 1:38 of round 1, the first of only three losses in Cruz's career.

At WEC 28: WrekCage on June 3, 2007, Faber defeated Chance Farrar by rear-naked choke submission at 3:19 of the first round. In his post-fight interview, Faber called out K-1 Hero's 2005 Middleweight Tournament Champion Norifumi Yamamoto, though the fight never materialized. After this match, Faber took a six-month break between fights, the longest of his career. He came back at WEC 31: Faber vs. Curran on December 12, 2007, defeating Jeff Curran by guillotine choke submission at 4:34 of the second round. Also on this card was the WEC debut of Jens Pulver, who was moving back down to featherweight from the lightweight division. In Pulver's WEC debut, he submitted Cub Swanson in the first round of their match setting up a title match between Pulver and Faber. Pulver and Faber both commented in their post-fight interviews that they wanted to fight each other, and the match was signed for June 1, 2008, at WEC 34: Faber vs. Pulver. Faber and Pulver fought a constant back-and-forth battle, but neither man was able to finish the other and the fight went the full five rounds, the first time in Faber's WEC career that one of his fights had gone the distance. The judges scored the bout a unanimous decision for Faber, (50–45, 50–44, and 50–44). This fight also marked both the first time that one of Pulver's fights at featherweight had gone to decision and the first time Pulver had been defeated at that weight class.

Losing the title

Faber was next scheduled to fight Mike Brown at WEC 36 on September 10, 2008, at the Seminole Hard Rock Hotel & Casino in Hollywood, Florida. However, this fight was postponed due to the threat of Hurricane Ike and was rescheduled for November 5, 2008, at the same location. Faber was defeated via TKO at 2:23 of the first round.

On January 25, 2009, at WEC 38 Faber fought Jens Pulver in a rematch, with Faber winning by guillotine choke submission at 1:34 of the first round. Post-fight, Faber addressed WEC Featherweight Champion Mike Brown, who was seated at ringside and announced he wanted a shot at regaining his title. When Brown made his first successful title defense at WEC 39 in Corpus Christi, Texas, he responded to Faber's comments by saying that a rematch between the two of them was something "the fans want to see."

Faber was defeated a second time by Mike Brown at WEC 41 on June 7, 2009, by a unanimous decision (49–46, 49–46, and 48–47) in front of his hometown crowd in Sacramento. Early in the fight, Faber broke his right hand and later dislocated his left thumb, resorting to using primarily elbows and kicks starting in the third round. Nonetheless, even in the fifth round, Faber threw 15 left hooks or jabs, many of which connected. Sherdog and ESPN.com in a post-fight article noted that Faber's "right hand was no match for the top of Mike Brown's head." Immediately after the fight, Faber stated that despite the close decision, he would still like another fight against Brown.

Faber appeared on WEC 43 as a guest commentator and returned to action in January. He submitted Brazilian jiu-jitsu black belt, Raphael Assunção via rear naked choke submission in third round at WEC 46, earning the Submission of the Night award.

With the victory over Assunção, Faber earned a shot to fight José Aldo for the WEC Featherweight Championship on April 24, 2010, at WEC 48. In the fight, he had no answer for the kicks from Aldo, which sent him to the canvas several times. Faber lost via unanimous decision.

Move to bantamweight
Faber decided to move down to bantamweight after his defeat by José Aldo at featherweight.
He was set to move down against Japanese striker Takeya Mizugaki on August 18, 2010, at WEC 50. However, Faber was forced off the card with an injury. As a result, Mizugaki was also pulled from the event.

The bout with Mizugaki was rescheduled and took place on November 11, 2010, at WEC 52. Faber defeated Mizugaki via first round rear naked choke, earning Submission of the Night honors. With the victory over Mizugaki, Faber won his ninth WEC bout, a promotional record he shares with Antonio Banuelos and Poppies Martinez.

Ultimate Fighting Championship

On October 28, 2010, the WEC merged with the UFC. As part of the merger, all WEC fighters were brought over to compete in the two new weight divisions.

Faber made his promotional debut against former WEC Bantamweight Champion Eddie Wineland on March 19, 2011, at UFC 128. Faber won the back-and-forth fight via unanimous decision.

A rematch with Dominick Cruz, whose only defeat to that point came by Faber in 2007 took place on July 2, 2011, at UFC 132, in which Faber lost via unanimous decision. Both participants earned Fight of the Night honors.

Faber faced Brian Bowles on November 19, 2011, at UFC 139. It was said that the winner would be awarded with a title shot. Faber defeated Bowles via second round submission (guillotine choke), earning Submission of the Night honors.

Following his win at UFC 139, Faber was selected to be a coach on The Ultimate Fighter: Live opposite Dominick Cruz. Following the conclusion of the reality show, it was confirmed that Faber/Cruz III was expected to take place on July 7, 2012, at UFC 148. However, Cruz was forced to pull out of the bout citing ACL injury. It was then announced that Faber would remain on the UFC 148 fight card and face Renan Barão in a bout for the UFC Interim Bantamweight Championship, where the winner would go on to face Dominick Cruz for the UFC Undisputed Bantamweight Championship at a later date. However, due to an injury to headliner José Aldo, who was supposed to fight Erik Koch in the originally-scheduled main event, the Faber/Barão bout was moved from UFC 148 on July 7, 2012, to UFC 149 on July 21, 2012, as the event's new main event. He lost the fight by unanimous decision, suffering a broken rib during the first round.

Faber faced Ivan Menjivar in a rematch on February 23, 2013, at UFC 157. Faber defeated Menjivar in the first round with a rear naked choke submission.

On April 13, 2013, Faber faced Scott Jorgensen at The Ultimate Fighter 17 Finale. After a fast-paced and technical fight, Faber submitted Jorgensen via rear-naked choke at 3:16 in the 4th round. In the ringside interview, Faber noted, "He knows my stuff, so it was a tough fight. He made one small technical error, and I was able to capitalize on it. Props to Scotty for being a great fighter."

Faber faced Iuri Alcântara on August 17, 2013, at UFC Fight Night 26. Despite being in trouble early in the first round, Faber recovered and used his wrestling and relentless top game, outstriking Alcântara 127 to 25 over the duration of the bout. As a result, Faber earned a unanimous decision victory.

Faber faced Michael McDonald on December 14, 2013, at UFC on Fox 9. In the second round, Faber stunned McDonald with a flurry of punches, McDonald went to the canvas and Faber jumped on him and finished the fight by submission due to a guillotine choke. Subsequently, Faber was awarded with Submission of the Night honors for his performance.

When Dominick Cruz injured himself before his unification bout with Renan Barão, Faber was chosen as the replacement in the title fight at UFC 169. Faber lost the fight via TKO in the first round. During the fight, Barão knocked Faber down, after which he proceeded to strike him on the ground. Faber grabbed Barão's leg, and gave the referee the thumbs-up, indicating that he wanted the fight to continue. The referee did not see the thumbs-up and stepped in to end the fight, to the surprise of Faber and the spectators. In his post-fight interview, he told Joe Rogan that he believed his teammate TJ Dillashaw should get the next crack at Barão.

Faber next faced Alex Caceres at UFC 175 on July 5, 2014. He won the fight via submission, making Caceres tap to a rear naked choke at 1:09 of the third round.

Faber was briefly linked to a bout with Masanori Kanehara on September 20, 2014, at UFC Fight Night 52. However, before the bout was officially announced, Faber was removed and Kanehara faced Alex Caceres.

Faber next faced Francisco Rivera on December 6, 2014, at UFC 181. Faber won the fight via second round submission. However, the ending was controversial, as Faber stunned Rivera with an eyepoke during a standup exchange. The eyepoke went unnoticed by the referee, but immediately preceded the fight ending submission. Rivera's management team indicated that they planned to appeal the result in hopes that it would be changed to a no contest, and that the UFC could schedule a rematch with Faber. Ultimately, the NSAC upheld the result of a submission victory for Faber.

A rematch with top contender Raphael Assunção was expected to headline UFC Fight Night 62 on March 21, 2015. However, Assunção was forced out of the bout as an ankle first injured in mid-December 2014 was slow to heal and that he was unable to resume the proper training to prepare for the fight in that time frame. Subsequently, the UFC removed Faber from the card, and he is expected to be rebooked, possibly against a new opponent at a different event.

A long speculated "superfight" with former UFC lightweight champion Frankie Edgar took place on May 16, 2015, at UFC Fight Night 66. After speculation as to what weight class the bout was to be contested, either featherweight, bantamweight or at a catchweight of somewhere in between, it was announced that the bout would be contested at featherweight. Faber lost the fight via unanimous decision, this was his first career loss in a non-title bout.

Faber faced Frankie Saenz on December 12, 2015, at UFC 194. He won the back-and-forth fight by unanimous decision.

A rubber match with Dominick Cruz took place on June 4, 2016, at UFC 199 for the UFC Bantamweight Championship. Faber's walkout song was Crazy In Love by Beyonce featuring Jay-Z. He lost the fight via unanimous decision.

Faber next faced Jimmie Rivera on September 10, 2016, at UFC 203. He lost the fight via unanimous decision.

Final fight and retirement
In October 2016, Faber announced that his next fight, a bout against Brad Pickett on December 17, 2016, at UFC on Fox 22 in his home town of Sacramento would be his last. Faber went on to win the fight by unanimous decision. After the conclusion of the bout, Faber confirmed his retirement from the sport after a 13-year career.

2019 return
After two-and-a half years away from mixed martial arts competition, Faber made his return to the Octagon as he faced Ricky Simón on July 13, 2019, at UFC Fight Night 155. He won the bout via TKO in the first round, becoming the second fighter to win a UFC bout after being inducted to the UFC Hall of Fame. This win earned him the Performance of the Night award. After the fight, Faber signed a new contract with the UFC.

Faber faced Petr Yan on December 14, 2019, at UFC 245. He lost via knockout in the third round.

Team Alpha Male
See Team Alpha Male

Other combat sports

In December 2021, Faber agreed on short notice to compete in his first Combat Jiu-Jitsu match against a CJJ world champion Elias Anderson, at the Featherweight edition of the CJJ world championships., but passport issues led to Faber being replaced by Erik Perez, who lost to Anderson. The match between Anderson and Faber was then re-booked for Combat Jiu-Jitsu Worlds Team Duel on December 18, 2022. Neither man was able to win regulation time and Faber lost by armbar in EBI overtime.

Faber returned to wrestling competition at the 2022 US Open alongside his teammate Clay Guida, coming away with a silver medal at the event.

Personal life

Faber and Jaslyn have a daughter, Cali, who was born on March 14, 2019, and a son, Rome, who was born on October 8, 2020.

Championships and awards
Ultimate Fighting Championship
UFC Hall of Fame
Fight of the Night (one time) vs. Dominick Cruz
Performance of the Night (one time) vs. Ricky Simón
Submission of the Night (two times) vs. Brian Bowles and Michael McDonald
Third most finishes in UFC Bantamweight division history (7)
Tied (with Rani Yahya) for most submissions in UFC Bantamweight division history (6)
Fifth most wins in UFC Bantamweight division history (11)
Tied (with Marlon Vera and T.J. Dillashaw) for third most fights in UFC Bantamweight division history (17)
World Extreme Cagefighting
WEC Featherweight Championship (One time)
Five successful title defenses
Fight of the Night (three times) 
Knockout of the Night (one time) 
Submission of the Night (four times) vs. 
Most consecutive title defenses in WEC history (five)
Most successful title defenses in WEC history (five)
King of the Cage
KOTC Bantamweight Championship (One time)
Five successful title defenses
Gladiator Challenge
GC Bantamweight Championship (Two Times)
MMAInsider.net
2013 Fight Camp of the Year (Team Alpha Male)
World MMA Awards
2013 Submission of the Year vs. Ivan Menjivar at UFC 157
Sherdog
2011 All-Violence First Team
2013 All-Violence First Team

Mixed martial arts record

|-
|Loss
|align=center|35–11
|Petr Yan
|KO (head kick)
|UFC 245 
|
|align=center|3
|align=center|0:43
|Las Vegas, Nevada, United States
|
|-
|Win
|align=center|35–10
|Ricky Simón
|TKO (punches)
|UFC Fight Night: de Randamie vs. Ladd 
|
|align=center|1
|align=center|0:46
|Sacramento, California, United States
|
|-
|Win
|align=center|34–10
|Brad Pickett
|Decision (unanimous)
|UFC on Fox: VanZant vs. Waterson
|
|align=center|3
|align=center|5:00
|Sacramento, California, United States
|
|-
|Loss
|align=center|33–10
|Jimmie Rivera
|Decision (unanimous)
|UFC 203
|
|align=center|3
|align=center|5:00
|Cleveland, Ohio, United States
|
|-
|Loss
|align=center|33–9
|Dominick Cruz
|Decision (unanimous)
|UFC 199
|
|align=center|5
|align=center|5:00
|Inglewood, California, United States
|
|-
| Win
| align=center| 33–8
| Frankie Saenz
| Decision (unanimous)
| UFC 194
| 
| align=center|3
| align=center|5:00
| Las Vegas, Nevada, United States
|
|-
| Loss
| align=center| 32–8
| Frankie Edgar
|Decision (unanimous)
| UFC Fight Night: Edgar vs. Faber
| 
| align=center| 5
| align=center| 5:00
| Pasay, Philippines
| 
|-
| Win
| align=center| 32–7
| Francisco Rivera
| Submission (bulldog choke)
| UFC 181
| 
| align=center| 2
| align=center| 1:34
| Las Vegas, Nevada, United States
|
|-
| Win
| align=center| 31–7
| Alex Caceres
| Submission (rear naked choke)
| UFC 175
| 
| align=center| 3
| align=center| 1:09
| Las Vegas, Nevada, United States
| 
|-
| Loss
| align=center| 30–7
| Renan Barão
| TKO (punches)
| UFC 169
| 
| align=center| 1
| align=center| 3:42
| Newark, New Jersey, United States
| 
|-
| Win
| align=center| 30–6
| Michael McDonald
| Submission (guillotine choke)
| UFC on Fox: Johnson vs. Benavidez 2
| 
| align=center| 2
| align=center| 3:22
| Sacramento, California, United States
| 
|-
| Win
| align=center| 29–6
| Iuri Alcântara
| Decision (unanimous)
| UFC Fight Night: Shogun vs. Sonnen
| 
| align=center| 3
| align=center| 5:00
| Boston, Massachusetts, United States
| 
|-
| Win 
| align=center| 28–6
| Scott Jorgensen
| Submission (rear-naked choke)
| The Ultimate Fighter: Team Jones vs. Team Sonnen Finale
| 
| align=center| 4
| align=center| 3:16
| Las Vegas, Nevada, United States
| 
|-
| Win
| align=center| 27–6
| Ivan Menjivar
| Submission (standing rear-naked choke)
| UFC 157
| 
| align=center| 1
| align=center| 4:34
| Anaheim, California, United States
| 
|-
| Loss
| align=center| 26–6
| Renan Barão
| Decision (unanimous)
| UFC 149
| 
| align=center| 5
| align=center| 5:00
| Calgary, Alberta, Canada
| 
|-
| Win
| align=center| 26–5
| Brian Bowles
| Submission (guillotine choke)
| UFC 139
| 
| align=center| 2
| align=center| 1:27
| San Jose, California, United States
| 
|-
| Loss
| align=center| 25–5
| Dominick Cruz
| Decision (unanimous)
| UFC 132
| 
| align=center| 5
| align=center| 5:00
| Las Vegas, Nevada, United States
| 
|-
| Win
| align=center| 25–4
| Eddie Wineland
| Decision (unanimous)
| UFC 128
| 
| align=center| 3
| align=center| 5:00
| Newark, New Jersey, United States
| 
|-
| Win
| align=center| 24–4
| Takeya Mizugaki
| Technical Submission (rear-naked choke)
| WEC 52
| 
| align=center| 1
| align=center| 4:50
| Las Vegas, Nevada, United States
| 
|-
| Loss
| align=center| 23–4
| José Aldo
| Decision (unanimous)
| WEC 48
| 
| align=center| 5
| align=center| 5:00
| Sacramento, California, United States
| 
|-
| Win
| align=center| 23–3
| Raphael Assunção
| Submission (rear-naked choke)
| WEC 46
| 
| align=center| 3
| align=center| 3:49
| Sacramento, California, United States
| 
|-
| Loss
| align=center| 22–3
| Mike Brown
| Decision (unanimous)
| WEC 41
| 
| align=center| 5
| align=center| 5:00
| Sacramento, California, United States
| 
|-
| Win
| align=center| 22–2
| Jens Pulver
| Submission (guillotine choke)
| WEC 38
| 
| align=center| 1
| align=center| 1:34
| San Diego, California, United States
| 
|-
| Loss
| align=center| 21–2
| Mike Brown
| TKO (punches)
| WEC 36
| 
| align=center| 1
| align=center| 2:23
| Hollywood, Florida, United States
| 
|-
| Win
| align=center| 21–1
| Jens Pulver
| Decision (unanimous)
| WEC 34
| 
| align=center| 5
| align=center| 5:00
| Sacramento, California, United States
| 
|-
| Win
| align=center| 20–1
| Jeff Curran
| Submission (guillotine choke)
| WEC 31
| 
| align=center| 2
| align=center| 4:34
| Las Vegas, Nevada, United States
| 
|-
| Win
| align=center| 19–1
| Chance Farrar
| Submission (rear-naked choke)
| WEC 28
| 
| align=center| 1
| align=center| 3:19
| Las Vegas, Nevada, United States
| 
|-
| Win
| align=center| 18–1
| Dominick Cruz
| Submission (guillotine choke)
| WEC 26
| 
| align=center| 1
| align=center| 1:38
| Las Vegas, Nevada, United States
| 
|-
| Win
| align=center| 17–1
| Joe Pearson
| TKO (punches and elbows)
| WEC 25
| 
| align=center| 1
| align=center| 2:31
| Las Vegas, Nevada, United States
| 
|-
| Win
| align=center| 16–1
| Bibiano Fernandes
| TKO (doctor stoppage)
| KOTC: All Stars
| 
| align=center| 1
| align=center| 4:16
| Reno, Nevada, United States
| 
|-
| Win
| align=center| 15–1
| Enoch Wilson
| TKO (doctor stoppage)
| FCP: Malice at Cow Palace
| 
| align=center| 2
| align=center| 1:01
| San Francisco, California, United States
| 
|-
| Win
| align=center| 14–1
| Naoya Uematsu
| TKO (punches)
| GC 51: Madness at the Memorial
| 
| align=center| 2
| align=center| 3:35
| Sacramento, California, United States
| 
|-
| Win
| align=center| 13–1
| Charlie Valencia
| Submission (rear-naked choke)
| KOTC: Predator
| 
| align=center| 1
| align=center| 3:09
| Globe, Arizona, United States
| 
|-
| Win
| align=center| 12–1
| Cole Escovedo
| TKO (corner stoppage)
| WEC 19
| 
| align=center| 2
| align=center| 5:00
| Lemoore, California, United States
| 
|-
| Win
| align=center| 11–1
| Ivan Menjivar
| DQ (illegal kick to downed opponent)
| TKO 24: Eruption
| 
| align=center| 2
| align=center| 2:02
| Laval, Quebec, Canada
| 
|-
| Win
| align=center| 10–1
| Charles Bennett
| Technical Submission (rear-naked choke)
| GC 46: Avalanche
| 
| align=center| 1
| align=center| 4:38
| Coarsegold, California, United States
| 
|-
| Win
| align=center| 9–1
| Shawn Bias
| Submission (standing guillotine choke)
| KOTC: Execution Day
| 
| align=center| 1
| align=center| 1:24
| Reno, Nevada, United States
| 
|-
| Loss
| align=center| 8–1
| Tyson Griffin
| TKO (punches)
| GC 42: Summer Slam
| 
| align=center| 3
| align=center| 0:05
| Lakeport, California, United States
| 
|-
| Win
| align=center| 8–0
| Hiroyuki Abe
| TKO (doctor stoppage)
| KOTC: Mortal Sins
| 
| align=center| 3
| align=center| 2:37
| Primm, Nevada, United States
| 
|-
| Win
| align=center| 7–0
| David Granados
| Submission (rear-naked choke)
| GC 35: Cold Fury
| 
| align=center| 1
| align=center| 2:13
| Porterville, California, United States
| 
|-
| Win
| align=center| 6–0
| Eben Kaneshiro
| TKO (punches)
| KOTC 44: Revenge
| 
| align=center| 3
| align=center| 4:33
| San Jacinto, California, United States
| 
|-
| Win
| align=center| 5–0
| Rami Boukai
| Decision (majority)
| KOTC 41: Relentless
| 
| align=center| 2
| align=center| 5:00
| San Jacinto, California, United States
| 
|-
| Win
| align=center| 4–0
| Del Hawkins
| TKO (punches)
| GC 30: Gladiator Challenge 30
| 
| align=center| 1
| align=center| 3:19
| Colusa, California, United States
| 
|-
| Win
| align=center| 3–0
| David Velasquez
| Decision (unanimous)
| GC 27: FightFest 2
| 
| align=center| 3
| align=center| 5:00
| Colusa, California, United States
| 
|-
| Win
| align=center| 2–0
| George Adkins
| TKO (corner stoppage)
| GC 22: Gladiator Challenge 22
| 
| align=center| 2
| align=center| 2:42
| Colusa, California, United States
| 
|-
| Win
| align=center| 1–0
| Jay Valencia
| Submission (guillotine choke)
| GC 20: Gladiator Challenge 20
| 
| align=center| 1
| align=center| 1:22
| Colusa, California, United States
|

Pay-Per-View Bouts

Filmography

See also
 List of current UFC fighters
 List of male mixed martial artists

References

External links

1979 births
Living people
American male mixed martial artists
American people of Irish descent
American people of Italian descent
Bantamweight mixed martial artists
Featherweight mixed martial artists
Mixed martial artists utilizing collegiate wrestling
Mixed martial artists utilizing Brazilian jiu-jitsu
Mixed martial artists from California
World Extreme Cagefighting champions
Mixed martial arts trainers
American people of Dutch descent
University of California, Davis alumni
People from Lincoln, California
Sportspeople from Sacramento, California
People from Isla Vista, California
American practitioners of Brazilian jiu-jitsu
Ultimate Fighting Championship male fighters